This is a '''list of law schools in Sri Lanka.

 Sri Lanka Law College
 Faculty of Law, University of Colombo
 Department of Law, Faculty of Arts, University of Jaffna
 Open University Law School, Sri Lanka
 Department of Law, Faculty of Arts, University of Peradeniya
  Faculty of Law,  General Sir John Kotelawala Defence University.

Sri Lanka